Lead chloride  may refer to:
 Lead(II) chloride (plumbous chloride), mineral name: cotunnite.
 Lead(IV) chloride (plumbic chloride)